Kepler-45, formerly known as KOI-254, is a star in the northern constellation of Cygnus. It is located at the celestial coordinates: right ascension , declination . With an apparent visual magnitude of 16.88, this star is too faint to be seen with the naked eye.

The star is exhibiting strong starspot activity, with 4.1% of its surface covered by starspots.

Planetary system

The "Hot Jupiter" class planet Kepler-45b, discovered in February 2011, is unusually massive for the M-class parent star. Its orbit is aligned within 11 degrees of rotational axis of the star.

The planet is strongly suspected to have optically thick rings, because planetary shadow appears to be elongated.

See also
NGTS-1b

References

Cygnus (constellation)
M-type main-sequence stars
254
Planetary transit variables
Planetary systems with one confirmed planet
J19312949+4103513